Bardon is a civil parish and former village in North West Leicestershire about  southeast of the centre of Coalville. With the population remaining less than 100, information from the 2011 census was included in the civil parish of Ellistown and Battleflat.

History
The village's name means 'tumulus hill'.

The site is a scheduled monument.

South of Bardon Hill is a second moat. This moat is square or rectangular. The moat island is the site of the old Bardon Hall, which was demolished in about 1840 after the current Bardon Hall was completed further up Bardon Hill. The latter is a Tudor revival house designed by the architect Robert Lugar and completed in about 1837.

Granite was being quarried from Bardon Hill by 1622. In 1832 the Leicester and Swannington Railway was opened, passing close by the then village of Bardon. A branch was built to the quarry and continues to carry granite from the quarry to this day. Bardon Hill railway station was near the parish church. The station was closed in the 20th century but the railway through it remains open for freight as part of the Leicester to Burton upon Trent Line.

In 1921 Bardon had a population of 511 and a public house called the Birch Tree. However, in the 1990s the village was demolished to allow the quarry to be expanded.

Bardon Hall
Bardon Hall is a mid-19th century Tudor revival house built in about 1830 or 1837. It was designed by the architect Robert Lugar for Robert Jacomb Hood. An earlier moated house, the Old Hall, was situated in a shallow valley in Bardon Park, south of Bardon Hill. The hall had been the property of members of the Hood family since the 1620s. The last male member of this family, William Hood, died in 1835 without issue. Hood left the estate to his cousin, Robert Jacomb, on condition that Robert assumed the surname of Hood.

The Old Hall was demolished in about 1840 for Robert Jacomb Hood, who described it in his memoirs as "too dilapidated for residence, and the situation was low, damp and unhealthy" The moat that surrounded it still remains.

In 1864 the whole estate was sold to William Percy Herrick of Beaumanor Hall. To improve access Herrick had a  private carriage road built, leading to the Ashby de la Zouch road.

The Hall is Grade II listed, and is the head office of Aggregate Industries, the owners of Bardon Hill Quarry.

Church and chapel

Parish church
St Peter's Church, Bardon was designed by the architect J.B. Everard (1844–1923) and built in 1899. St. Peter's was built in memory of two members of the Everard family who were co-owners of the quarry, and the architect also is buried in the churchyard. The church is built of granite, and its exterior masonry is not coursed but laid like crazy paving.

The tower has a saddleback roof topped by a flèche. It has three bells, all cast by John Taylor & Co of Loughborough in 1899.

St. Peter's parish is now part of a single benefice with Christ Church, Coalville and St. Michael and All Angels, Ravenstone. Bardon's ecclesiastical and civil parishes are not coterminous. St. Peter's church is about  outside the civil parish, in the civil parish of Coalville.

Chapel
Bardon Park Chapel is a 17th-century nonconformist chapel in the southernmost part of the parish, close to the main A511 road (formerly the A50) between M1 Junction 22 and Coalville. The chapel was built in about 1694 and altered in about 1830, 1877 and about 1900. A number of original 17th-century features survive, including the roof trusses and the wooden pulpit, which is octagonal and has fluted Doric pilasters. A wooden screen and doors date from the remodelling of about 1830. The chapel has always been galleried, but the original gallery which had wooden Doric columns was replaced in the remodelling of about 1900 with the present gallery on iron columns. The chapel is part of the United Reformed Church.

See also
Bardon Hill

References

Sources and further reading

External links

Civil parishes in Leicestershire
Former populated places in Leicestershire
North West Leicestershire District